Anaeomorpha is a monotypic genus of butterflies in the subfamily Charaxinae.

Species
There is one species, Anaeomorpha splendida, and two subspecies:
Anaeomorpha splendida splendida (Peru, Ecuador, Colombia)
Anaeomorpha splendida esmeralda Attal & Büche, 2008 (southern Peru)

Distribution
Anaeomorpha splendida is found in Peru, Ecuador and Colombia.

Biogeographic realm
Neotropical realm

Systematics

Clade showing phylogenetics of Anaeomorpha.

External links
"Anaeomorpha Rothschild, 1894" at Markku Savela's Lepidoptera and Some Other Life Forms

Charaxinae
Nymphalidae of South America
Monotypic butterfly genera
Taxa named by Walter Rothschild
Butterflies described in 1894
Nymphalidae genera